Naomi Too is a Kenyan female volleyball player in the Kenya women's national volleyball team.

Life   
Too played with the Kenya Pipeline team where she played with Gaudencia Makokha. In 2015 the two of them represented Kenya in Morocco at beach volleyball. They beat Mozambique and Nigeria to get to the final but they were beaten by Egypt and they gained the silver medal. It was the first medal for Kenya at the 2015 African Games in Rabat, Morocco.

In 2017 she and her then volleyball partner, Gaudencia Makokha, won a beach volleyball match and gained $3,400 in prize money.

Too was injured and she could not make the Olympic trials. Kenya's beach volleyball coach Sammy Mulinge invited Too to the Olympic training although he was concerned be her injury. Too was not included when the volleyball players names for the Olympics were revealed on 26 June 2021. Brackcides Khadambi was called to pair up with Gaudencia Makokha to replace Too and she and Gaudencia Makokha made up Kenya's beach volleyball team in Tokyo.

Clubs
  Kenya Pipeline

References

Living people
Kenyan women's volleyball players
Kenyan beach volleyball players
Women's beach volleyball players
Year of birth missing (living people)